Gowtanur (also Romanized as Gowtanūr; also known as Gowd Tanūr) is a village in Saghder Rural District, Jebalbarez District, Jiroft County, Kerman Province, Iran. At the 2006 census, its population was 16, in 6 families.

References 

Populated places in Jiroft County